Guri Helene Ingebrigtsen (19 May 1952 – 5 January 2020) was a Norwegian politician for the Labour Party.

Ingebrigtsen was born in Værøy. In the 1970s she was a member of the leftist Workers' Communist Party (AKP). In 1986, she worked in the Afghanistan Committee, giving medical aid. She was a graduate in medicine from the University of Oslo in 1982, having minored in criminology in 1976. Among several medicine-related jobs, she was a researcher at the University of Oslo from 1987 to 1996.

From 1996 to 1997, during the cabinet Jagland, she was appointed political advisor to the Minister of Health and Social Affairs. From 2000 to 2001, during the first cabinet Stoltenberg, she headed the same Ministry.

On the local level Ingebrigtsen was a member of Vestvågøy municipal council from 1995 to 1999, and then served as mayor from 1999 to 2007.

On 5 January 2020, Ingebrigtsen died from cancer at the age of 67.

References

1952 births
2020 deaths
Deaths from cancer in Norway
People from Værøy
People from Vestvågøy
Government ministers of Norway
Mayors of places in Nordland
Labour Party (Norway) politicians
University of Oslo alumni
Academic staff of the University of Oslo
20th-century Norwegian physicians
Norwegian women physicians
Women mayors of places in Norway
20th-century Norwegian women politicians
20th-century Norwegian politicians
Women government ministers of Norway